Espoon keskus (Finnish for Espoo Centre) is the central district of Espoo, the second biggest city of Finland and the administrative centre with the city hall of Espoo. The areas of Kiltakallio, Kirkkojärvi, Saarniraivio, Suna, Suvela and Tuomarila belong to Espoon keskus. To the east, Espoon keskus borders the city of Kauniainen, an enclave within the city of Espoo.

Even though Espoon keskus is located at the approximate geographical centre of the city, it is not a major population or economic center. In fact, Espoon keskus has had a negative reputation among the people living in Espoo in the past. At the moment the city of Espoo is making a serious effort to give Espoon keskus a new look. A new upper secondary school and a swimming hall have been built, the general appearance of the area is being lifted and new road building projects are about.

Many people from the Finnish capital area, mainly from Helsinki, view the district of Tapiola and its environs as the real commercial centre of Espoo, even though they are very close to the city border with Helsinki.

History

Archaeological evidence shows that the area which Espoon keskus dominates today was inhabited several thousands of years ago. The area has had a permanent settlement for at least 700–800 years.

The name Espoon keskus dates back to the 1970s, and before that the area was called Espoon kylä (Esbo by in Swedish) or Espoon pitäjä. The village consisted of five larger estates (that have later given their names to some areas that belong to Espoon keskus): Doms (Tuomarila), Jofs (Jouppi), Kirsti (Kirstinmäki), Dahl and Suna. The oldest parts of the Cathedral of Espoo date back to the 1480s. Before that there was a wooden church on the site. The first kansakoulu (elementary school) of Espoo, Lagstads folkskola, was opened in 1873. In the beginning of the 20th century, Espoon keskus was also called Muurala, which is the modern name of a district of Espoo, Muurala, located northwest of Espoon keskus. However, "Muurala" might replace the name of Espoon keskus as part of the efforts to improve the reputation of the area.

See also
 Districts of Espoo

External links

Official information about Espoon keskus
 Map of Espoon keskus

Districts of Espoo